Apocrypta bakeri is a species of fig wasps in the family Pteromalidae. It has Ficus hispida as its host, where it parasitizes the other fig wasp Ceratosolen solmsi.

References 

 Biology and behaviour of Apocrypta bakeri Joseph (Torymidae), cleptoparasite of Ceratosolen marchali Mayr (Agaonidae). Abdurahiman U.C. and Joseph K.J., 1978

External links 

 

Pteromalidae
Insects described in 1952